Splendrillia bozzettii is a species of sea snail, a marine gastropoda mollusk in the family Drilliidae.

Distribution
This marine species occurs off the Philippines..

Description
The length of the shelkl attains 16 mm.

References

 Stahlschmidt P., Poppe G.T. & Tagaro S.P. (2018). Descriptions of remarkable new turrid species from the Philippines. Visaya. 5(1): 5-64 page(s): 13, pl. 8 figs 1-3.

External links
 Worms Link

bozzettii
Gastropods described in 2018